Grimm (or The Grimm) is a former island in the Alster river at Hamburg, Germany,  east of Cremon. Today there is a street in the old town, the road is probably on the island.

Adolf III, Count of Schauenburg and Holstein had brought settlers from Westphalia to colonise the island. Its shore was built up after three floods from 1216 to 1219 and the island reclaimed. Up to 1300, the island was outside the city walls. In 1246 Grimm was absorbed by the city of Hamburg, and together with Cremon formed the parish of the newly built St. Catherine's Church.

Grimm was untouched by the Hamburg fire of 1842 and was one of the few areas of the old city to retain its historic structure in the 20th Century. These were mainly four-storey and three-to five-axis Hamburg merchant's houses from the Baroque, with typical facades, portals and rich pre-built Ausluchten. The early 20th Century, however, saw a change in the composition of the population.  

The painted ceiling of Grimm 31 has been preserved in the Museum of Hamburg History since its opening in 1922.

References 

 Hermann Heckmann: Barock und Rokoko in Hamburg, Verlag für Bauwesen, Berlin 1990
 Henny Wiepking, Hg. Otto Krahn, Hamburg 1961
 luz: Grimm in: Franklin Kopitzsch und Daniel Tilgner (Hg.): Hamburg Lexikon

External links 

 Ralf Lange: Grimm's Märchen: es war einmal (in German)

History of Hamburg
Islands of Hamburg